Club Deportivo Lumbreras is a football team based in Puerto Lumbreras, Murcia. Founded in 1968, the team plays in Primera Autonómica. 

The club's home ground is Estadio Municipal.

Season to season

7 seasons in Tercera División

External links
Official website
Trecera.com profile
Primera Autonómica

Football clubs in the Region of Murcia
Association football clubs established in 1968
Divisiones Regionales de Fútbol clubs
1968 establishments in Spain